The Knüllgebirge or simply Knüll is a small mountain range in the northern part of Hesse, Germany, approximately  south of Kassel. The area is heavily forested and has a low population density compared to neighbouring regions. The principal town of the region is Schwarzenborn, with a population of 1158 (2006), which is the site of German army Jägerregiment 1 headquarters.

References
Kümmerly and Frey. The New International Atlas. Rand McNally (1980) 
 Knüllgebirgsverein, Hiking and Nature Club

Mountains of Hesse
!
North Hesse